= Sanctuaries in Silesia =

The following is a list of sanctuaries in Silesia.

In the last 20 years there has been a noticeable increase in the pilgrimage movement in Poland, triggered by the papacy of John Paul II. The main sanctuary of Poland is the Pauline Monastery on Jasna Góra in Częstochowa. Millions of pilgrims from Poland and all over the world make their way there every year. There are also many other sacred places which people can visit:

- Piekary Slaskie
- Dabrowa Gornicza
- Katowice Bogucice
- Katowice Panewniki
- Mstow
- Myszkow Mrzyglod
- Pszow
- Skoczow
- Turza
- Żarki Lesniow
